James Arnold Frere  (20 April 1920 – 26 November 1994) was an English herald who was officer of arms at the College of Arms in London.

Biography
He was the only son of John Geoffrey Frere of Hartley and Violet Ivy Sparks. Following military service in the Intelligence Corps, he began his heraldic career on 24 February 1948 when he was appointed Bluemantle Pursuivant of Arms in Ordinary. Interested in costume, he took part in the ceremonies for the funeral of King George VI and the coronation of Queen Elizabeth II. He held this post until his appointment as Chester Herald of Arms in Ordinary on 23 January 1956 to replace John Heaton-Armstrong. Frere would hold this post until his retirement in 1960 to work in the Law Courts in the Strand. He was author of The British Monarchy at Home (1963) and co-author with the Duchess of Bedford of Now...the Duchess (1964). He inherited a coat of arms from his father. The blazon was Or two Leopards Faces in pale between Flaunches Gules.

Arms

See also
Heraldry
Pursuivant
Herald

References

The College of Arms
CUHAGS Officer of Arms Index
His armorial shield

English officers of arms
1920 births
1994 deaths
English genealogists
20th-century English historians
English male non-fiction writers
James
20th-century English male writers